Carlos García (born 20 August 1975) is a Spanish long-distance runner. He competed in the men's 5000 metres at the 2004 Summer Olympics.

References

1975 births
Living people
Athletes (track and field) at the 2004 Summer Olympics
Spanish male long-distance runners
Olympic athletes of Spain
Place of birth missing (living people)
Universiade silver medalists for Spain
Universiade medalists in athletics (track and field)